This is a list of the extreme points of Sri Lanka.

Heading

Altitude
 Highest point: Pidurutalagala (Mount Pedro),

See also
Extreme points of Earth
Geography of Sri Lanka
 

Geography of Sri Lanka
Sri Lanka